There have been two baronetcies created for persons with the surname Dudley, one in the Baronetage of England and one in the Baronetage of the United Kingdom. Both creations are extinct.

The Dudley Baronetcy, of Clopton in the County of Northampton, was created in the Baronetage of England on 1 August 1660 for William Dudley. The second Baronet represented Northampton and Huntingdonshire in Parliament. The title became extinct on the death of the third Baronet in 1764. The Barons Dudley were members of another branch of the family.

The Dudley Baronetcy, of Sloane Street, Chelsea, in the County of Middlesex, and of Kilscoran House in the County of Wexford, was created in the Baronetage of the United Kingdom on 17 April 1813 for the minister, magistrate and playwright Henry Dudley. The title became extinct on his death in 1824.

Dudley baronets, of Clopton (1660)

Sir William Dudley, 1st Baronet (died 1670)
Sir Matthew Dudley, 2nd Baronet (1661–1721)
Sir William Dudley, 3rd Baronet (1696–1764)

Dudley baronets, of Sloane Street and Kilscoran House (1813)
Sir Henry Bate Dudley, 1st Baronet (1745–1824)

References

Extinct baronetcies in the Baronetage of England
Extinct baronetcies in the Baronetage of the United Kingdom